

Paris 

 Château de Bagatelle
 Château de Bagnolet Ruined
 Bastille Ruined
 Conciergerie Accessible
 Louvre Palace Accessible
 Palais du Luxembourg Accessible
 Château de Madrid Ruined
 Château de la Muette
 Palais-Royal Accessible
 Château de Reuilly Ruined
 Maison du Temple Ruined
 Château de la Tournelle Ruined
 Palais des Tuileries Ruined

Seine-et-Marne 

 Château d'Aunoy, Champeaux
 Château de Blandy-les-Tours, Blandy Accessible
 Château des Boulayes, Châtres
 Château de Bourron, Bourron-Marlotte. Accessible
 Château de Brie-Comte-Robert, Brie-Comte-Robert Accessible
 Château de Brou, Brou-sur-Chantereine Accessible
 Château de By, Thomery, place of death of Rosa Bonheur, French painter
 Château de Champgueffier, La Chapelle-Iger  Accessible
 Château de Champs-sur-Marne, Champs-sur-Marne  Accessible
 Château de La Chapelle, La Chapelle-Gauthier
 Château de Diant, Diant
 Château d'Égreville, Égreville
 Château de Ferrières, Ferrières-en-Brie Accessible
 Château de Fleury-en-Bière, Fleury-en-Bière
 Palace of Fontainebleau, Fontainebleau Accessible
 Château de Forges, Montereau
 Château de Fortoiseau, Villiers-en-Bière, place of death of Philippe Néricault Destouches, actor and dramatist.
 Château de Grandpuits, Grandpuits-Bailly-Carrois
 Château de la Grange-Bléneau, Courpalay
 Château de la Grange-le-Roy, Grisy-Suisnes
 Château de la Trousse, Cocherel
 Château de Guermantes, Guermantes
 Château du Houssoy, Crouy-sur-Ourcq
 Château du Jard, Voisenon
 Château de Jossigny, Jossigny
 Château de Montaiguillon, Louan-Villegruis-Fontaine
 Château de Montceaux, otherwise known as Château des Reines, Montceaux-lès-Meaux
 Château de Montgermont, Pringy
 Château de Moret, Moret-sur-Loing
 Château de La Motte Nangis, Nangis
 Château de Nandy, Nandy
 Château de Nantouillet, Nantouillet
 Château de Nemours, Nemours  Accessible
 Château de Poncher, Lésigny
 Château du Pré, Chartrettes
 Château de la Reine Blanche, Provins Accessible
 Château de Rouillon, Chartrettes
 Château de Saint-Ange de Villecerf, Villecerf
 Château de Sainte-Assise, Seine-Port
 Château de Sigy, Sigy
 Château de Vaux-le-Vicomte, Maincy, former residence of Nicolas Fouquet, Superintendent of Finances to Louis XIV.  Accessible
 Château de Villiers-Chapuis, Pamfou
 Château de Villiers-les-Maillets, Saint-Barthélemy
 Château des Vives Eaux, Dammarie-lès-Lys
 Château de Voisenon, Voisenon

Yvelines 

Incorporating part of the ancient province of Hurepoix
 Château d'Acosta, Aubergenville, Ruined
 Château d'Agnou, Maule
 Château de Madame du Barry, Louveciennes
 Château de Beynes, Beynes Accessible
 Château de La Boissière, La Boissière-École
 Château de Bonnelles, Bonnelles
 Château de Boulémont, Herbeville Accessible
 Château de Breteuil, Choisel Accessible
 Château du Breuil, Garancières
 Château du Buat, Maule Accessible
 Château de la Celle, La Celle Saint-Cloud
 Château des Clayes-sous-Bois, Clayes-sous-Bois
 Château de Coubertin, Saint-Rémy-lès-Chevreuse Accessible
 Château de Dampierre, Dampierre-en-Yvelines Accessible
 Château d'Épône, Épône
 Château de Grignon, Thiverval-Grignon
 Château de Groussay, Montfort-l'Amaury
 Château du Haut-Buc, Buc Accessible
 Donjon de Houdan, Houdan Accessible
 Château de Launay, Villiers-le-Mahieu Accessible
 Château de la Madeleine, Chevreuse Accessible
 Château de Maisons, Maisons-Laffitte Accessible
 Château de Marly, Marly-le-Roi
 Donjon de Maurepas, Maurepas
 Château de Mauvières, Saint-Forget Accessible
 Château de Médan, Médan
Château de Méridon, Chevreuse
 Château du Mesnil-Saint-Denis, Mesnil-Saint-Denis Accessible
 Château des Mesnuls, Mesnuls
 Château de Monte-Cristo, Port-Marly Accessible
 Château de Montfort, also Tour Anne-de-Bretagne, Montfort-l'Amaury
 Pavillon de la Muette, Saint-Germain-en-Laye
 Château de Neuville, Gambais
 Château de Plaisir, Plaisir
 Château de Pontchartrain, Jouars-Pontchartrain
 Château de Rambouillet, Rambouillet
 Château de La Rolanderie, Maule
 Château de Rosny-sur-Seine, Rosny-sur-Seine
 Château de Saint-Germain-en-Laye, Saint-Germain-en-Laye Accessible
 Chateau-Neuf de Saint-Germain-en-Laye, Saint-Germain-en-Laye
 Château de Sauvage, Émancé Accessible
 Château de Théméricourt, Conflans-Sainte-Honorine Accessible
 Château de Thoiry, Thoiry Accessible
 Grand Trianon, Versailles
 Petit Trianon, Versailles
 Château du Val, Saint-Germain-en-Laye
 Château de Triel, Triel-sur-Seine
 Palace of Versailles, Versailles Accessible
 Château de Villennes, Villennes-sur-Seine
 Château de Villiers, Poissy
 Château de Villiers-le-Mahieu, Villiers-le-Mahieu
 Château de Voisins, Saint-Hilarion Accessible
 Château de Wideville, Crespières

Essonne 

Ancient province of Hurepoix
 Château d'Amblainvilliers, Verrières-le-Buisson
 Château d'Angervilliers, Angervilliers. French Historic Monument.
 Château d'Ardenay, Palaiseau. Private residence
 Manoir des Ardenelles, Villeconin. French Historic Monument.
 Château d'Arny, Bruyères-le-Châtel.
 Manoir des Arpentis, Vauhallan
 Château d'Athis, Athis-Mons. French Historic Monument.
 Château d’Avaucourt, Athis-Mons Accessible
 Château d'Avrainville, Avrainville .
 Château de Bandeville, Saint-Cyr-sous-Dourdan. French Historic Monument.
 Château de Baville, Saint-Chéron. French Historic Monument.
 Château de Beauregard, Saint-Jean-de-Beauregard. French Historic Monument.  Accessible
 Château de Beauvoir, Évry
 Château de Bel-Ébat, Marcoussis. Private residence.
 Château de Bellejame, Marcoussis.
 Château de Bièvres, Bièvres.
 Château du Bois-Courtin, Villejust. Private residence.
 Château du Bois Loriot, Verrières-le-Buisson.
 Château de Boutervilliers, Boutervilliers.
 Château de Brunehaut, Morigny-Champigny.
 Château de Bruyères-le-Châtel, Bruyères-le-Châtel.
 Château des Célestins, Marcoussis. Ruined
 Château de Cerny, Cerny
 Château de Chaiges, Athis-Mons.
 Château de Chamarande, Chamarande. French Historic Monument. Accessible
 Château de Chanteloup, Saint-Germain-lès-Arpajon .
 Château de Cheptainville, Cheptainville.
 Château de Chilly-Mazarin, Chilly-Mazarin. French Historic Monument.
 Château de Corbeville, Orsay. Thales research centre.
 Château de Courances, Courances . French Historic Monument. Accessible
 Château de Courdimanche, Courdimanche-sur-Essonne. French Historic Monument.
 Château de Courson, Courson-Monteloup. French Historic Monument. Accessible
 Château de Dommerville, Dommerville. French Historic Monument. Accessible
 Château de Dourdan, Dourdan. French Historic Monument. Accessible
 Château d'Écharcon, Écharcon. French Historic Monument.
 Château de Farcheville, Bouville. French Historic Monument. Accessible
 Manoir de Favreuse, Bièvres.
 Château de la Fontaine, Brétigny-sur-Orge. School.
 Château de Forges, Forges-les-Bains. French Historic Monument.
 Château de Frémigny, Bouray-sur-Juine
 Château de Gif-sur-Yvette, Gif-sur-Yvette. Town hall.
 Château de Gillevoisin, Janville-sur-Juine. French Historic Monument.
 Château de Gironville, Gironville-sur-Essonne.
 Château du Grand Mesnil, Orsay. Psychiatric hospital.
 Château du Grand-Saint-Mars, Chalo-Saint-Mars. French Historic Monument.
 Château du Grand-Saussay, Ballancourt-sur-Essonne. French Historic Monument. Accessible
 Château de la Grange, Villeconin . French Historic Monument. Accessible
 Château de la Grange, Yerres. French Historic Monument.
 Château de Grillon, Dourdan, birthplace of Jean-François Regnard, author and dramatist.
 Tour de Guinette, Étampes. French Historic Monument.
 Château d'Huison-Longueville, D'Huison-Longueville. French Historic Monument.
 Château de Janvry, Janvry.
 Château de Jeurre, Morigny-Champigny. French Historic Monument.
 Château de Launay, Orsay. Paris XI University seat.
 Château de Leuville, Leuville-sur-Orge.
 Château de Limon, Vauhallan.
 Château de Lormoy, Longpont-sur-Orge. Nursing home.
 Château du Marais, au Val-Saint-Germain. Place of death of Gaston Palewski, French politician. French Historic Monument. Accessible.
 Château de la Martinière, Saclay.
 Château de Méréville, Méréville. French Historic Monument. Accessible Château du Mesnil, Longpont-sur-Orge
 Château de Mesnil-Voisin, Bouray-sur-Juine. French Historic Monument.
 Château de Mignaux, Verrières-le-Buisson. Ruined Château de Milly-la-Forêt, Milly-la-Forêt. French Historic Monument.
 Château de Montagu, Marcoussis. French Historic Monument.
 Château de Monthuchet, Saulx-les-Chartreux.
 Château de Montlhéry, Montlhéry. French Historic Monument.
 Château de Montmirault, Cerny. Ruined Château de Morigny, Morigny-Champigny. French Historic Monument.
 Château de Morsang, Morsang-sur-Orge. French Historic Monument.
 Château de La Norville, La Norville.
 Château d'Ollainville, Ollainville. Ruined Château d'Orgemont, Cerny. Private residence.
 Château d'Orgeval, Villemoisson-sur-Orge. French Historic Monument.
 Manoir d'Orsigny, Saclay
 Château d'Ozonville, Athis-Mons. Nursing home.
 Château de Paron, Verrières-le-Buisson.
 Château des Pastoureaux, Lardy
 Château de Petit-Bourg, Évry. Ruined Château du Petit-Marais, Puiselet-le-Marais.
 Château du Petit-Saint-Mars, Étampes. Nursing home.
 Château du Plessis-Saint-Père, La Ville-du-Bois
 Château de Presles, Cerny. Property of the Carnot family since 1838.
 Manoir de Richeville, Vauhallan
 Château de la Roche, Ollainville.
 Château des Roches, Bièvres. Property of the Soka Gakkai sect. French Historic Monument.
 Château de Roinville, Roinville-sous-Dourdan. French Historic Monument.
 Château de la Roue, Linas. Ruined Château du Rué, Ollainville.
 Château de Sainte-Geneviève-des-Bois, Sainte-Geneviève-des-Bois. French Historic Monument.
 Château de Saudreville, Villeconin. French Historic Monument.
Château du Saussay, Ballancourt-sur-Essonne
 Château de la Saussaye, Palaiseau. Private residence.
 Château Silvy, Bièvres. Town Hall
 Château de la Souche, Montlhéry.
Domaine de Souzy-la-Briche, Souzy-la-Briche
 Temple de la Gloire, Orsay. French Historic Monument.
 Château de Trousseau, Ris-Orangis. French Historic Monument.
 Château de Valnay, Étampes
 Château de Vauboyen, Bièvres. French Historic Monument.
 Château de Vaudouleurs, Morigny-Champigny.
 Château de Verrières, Verrières-le-Buisson. Town Hall.
 Château de Vilgénis, Massy. Air France training centre. French Historic Monument.
 Château de Villebon-sur-Yvette, Villebon-sur-Yvette. Private school.
 Château de Villebouzin, Longpont-sur-Orge. Nursing home.
 Château de la Ville-du-Bois, La Ville-du-Bois. Private school.
 Château de Villeconin, Villeconin Accessible Château de Villelouvette, Égly
 Château de Villemartin, Morigny-Champigny.
 Château de Villiers, Cerny. Property of the De Selve family from 6 December 1528 until 11 April 1935. From 3 July 1959 until 2001, the property was in the ownership of Philippe Clay.
 Château de Villiers, Draveil. French Historic Monument.
 Château de Villiers, Villiers-le-Bâcle. French Historic Monument.
 Château de Villiers-le-Bâcle, Villiers-le-Bâcle. Property of Yves Lecoq. French Historic Monument.
 Château de Vilmorin, Verrières-le-Buisson. French Historic Monument.
 Château de Voisins-le-Tuit, Villiers-le-Bâcle.
 Château d'Yerres, Yerres. French Historic Monument.

 Hauts-de-Seine 

Incorporating part of the ancient province of Hurepoix
 Château d'Antony, Antony.
 Château d'Asnières, Asnières-sur-Seine. French Historic Monument.
 Château Barral, Clamart. Town hall. French Historic Monument.
 Château de Bellevue, Meudon. Ruined Château de Bois-Préau, Rueil-Malmaison. Museum. Accessible Château La Boissière, Fontenay-aux-Roses. French Historic Monument.
 Château de Bourg-la-Reine, Bourg-la-Reine.
 Château La Boursidière, Châtenay-Malabry.
 Château de Brimborion, Sèvres. Ruined Château de Buschillot, Boulogne-Billancourt. French Historic Monument.
 Château de Buzenval, Rueil-Malmaison. Secondary school.
 Château de Chaville, Chaville .
 Château Colbert, Plessis-Robinson.
 Château des Colonnes, Courbevoie.
 Château du Duc de Richelieu, Gennevilliers. Ruined La Folie-Saint-James, Neuilly-sur-Seine. Sixth-form college.
 Château de Fontenay, Fontenay-aux-Roses. French Historic Monument.
 Château des Landes, Suresnes. Ruined Château de Madrid, Neuilly-sur-Seine. Ruined Château de Malmaison, Rueil-Malmaison. Accessible Château de la Marche, Marnes-la-Coquette. Ruined Château du Marquis de Chamillart, Marnes-la-Coquette. Ruined Château du Marquis de Chateauneuf, Montrouge. Ruined Château de Meudon, Meudon . Ruined Château de Neuilly, Neuilly-sur-Seine. Ruined Château d'Ozanam, Asnières-sur-Seine. French Historic Monument.
 Château de la Petite Malmaison, Rueil-Malmaison. French Historic Monument.
 Château de la Petite Roseraie, Châtenay-Malabry. French Historic Monument.
 Château du Plessis-Piquet, Plessis-Robinson. Town hall.
 Château des Princes de Conti, Issy-les-Moulineaux Accessible Château de la Ronce, Ville-d'Avray Ruined Château Rothschild, Boulogne-Billancourt. French Historic Monument.
 Château de Saint-Cloud, Saint-Cloud. French Historic Monument.
 Château Sainte-Barbe-des-Champs, Fontenay-aux-Roses.
 Château de Sceaux, Sceaux. French Historic Monument. Accessible Château de Sèvres, Sèvres. Ruined Château de Suresnes, Suresnes. Ruined Château de Thierry, Ville-d'Avray.
 Château du Val, Rueil-Malmaison. Ruined La Vallée-aux-Loups, Châtenay-Malabry. Museum. Accessible Château La Vallière, Montrouge. Ruined Château de Vanves, Vanves. Now a lycée 
 Château de Villebon, Meudon. Ruined Château de Villeneuve-l'Étang, Marnes-la-Coquette. Private institute.

 Seine-Saint-Denis 

 Château des Cèdres, Montfermeil Accessible Château de Gournay, Gournay-sur-Marne
 Petit Château, Montfermeil
 Château de Romainville, Romainville
 Château de Sevran ou Château du Fayet, Sevran
 Château de Saint-Ouen, Saint-Ouen  Accessible Château de Villemomble, Villemomble

 Val-de-Marne 

Beauté-sur-Marne, Nogent-sur-Marne Ruined Château de Bercy, Charenton-le-Pont Ruined Château de Berny, Fresnes Ruined Château de Boissy-Saint-Léger, Boissy-Saint-Léger
 Château de Choisy, Choisy-le-Roi Ruined Château de Grosbois, Boissy-Saint-Léger Accessible Château d'Ormesson-sur-Marne, Ormesson-sur-Marne Accessible Château du Parangon, Joinville-le-Pont
 Pavillon d'Antoine de Navarre, Charenton-le-Pont
 Château de Saint-Maur, Saint-Maur-des-Fossés Ruined Château de Vincennes, Vincennes Accessible Val-d'Oise 

 Château d'Ambleville, Ambleville Accessible Château d'Arnouville, Arnouville
 Château d'Auvers, Auvers-sur-Oise Accessible Château de Balincourt, Menouville
 Château de Beaumont-sur-Oise, Beaumont-sur-Oise
 Château de Champlâtreux, Épinay-Champlâtreux Accessible Château d'Écouen, Écouen Accessible Château de Franconville Saint-Martin-du-Tertre (Val-d'Oise)
 Château du Grand-Bury, Margency
 Château de Grouchy, Osny Accessible Château de Hazeville, Wy-dit-Joli-Village
 Château d'Hérouville, Hérouville
 Château de Marines, Marines
 Château de Maudétour, Maudétour-en-Vexin Accessible Château de Méry, Méry-sur-Oise Accessible Château de Neuville, Neuville-sur-Oise
 Manoir d'Omerville, Omerville
 Château de La Roche-Guyon, La Roche-Guyon Accessible Château de Stors, L'Isle-Adam Accessible Château de Théméricourt, Théméricourt
 Château de Vigny, Vigny
 Château de Villarceaux, Chaussy Accessible'''

Notes and references

See also

 List of castles in France

External links
https://www.pop.culture.gouv.fr/

 Chateaux in Ile-de-France